Sunrise Earth is a nature documentary television series that last aired in the United States in 2008 on HD Theater (originally Discovery HD Theater), which has since been reformatted and rebranded as Velocity. The series focused on presenting the viewer with sunrises in various geographical locations throughout the world. It is also notable for its complete lack of human narration, concentrating instead on the natural sounds of each episodes' specific location. High-definition video and Dolby 5.1 stereo surround sound are used to present each natural environment in a clear and detailed manner. The show is an example of the genre known as "Experiential TV", developed by series creator David Conover. The technique has been described by TV critic Tom Shales as "crazily uneventful and thoroughly wonderful."

Compass Light, Conover's small production company in Camden, Maine, started producing the series in 2004. Clint Stinchcomb helped produce the series. 64 one-hour Sunrise Earth shows were created in the first four years of production. The crew shoots with high-definition video cameras, and the editors cut between multiple perspectives at a leisurely pace. The show is presented in real-time, with each shot lasting an average of 30 seconds. Each episode captures one sunrise from a certain location, such as Machu Picchu, Turkey or Scandinavia. Captions in the lower portion of the frame occasionally give information as to the location, time, and events on screen.

Sunrise Earth aired weekdays at 7a.m. and 10a.m. Eastern Time on Discovery HD Theater.  However, as of mid-March 2011, the show no longer airs on any channel (current or otherwise), except on Amazon Prime, and is rumored to have been cancelled, though no official word from Discovery or Compass Light has confirmed this.

All three seasons were made available on Amazon Prime.

Episode list
Season 1
 Moose in the Morning
 Yellowstone Geysers
 Gator Hole
 Bison Before Breakfast
 Sea of Terns
 Vermont Balloons
 Alewife Eternal Return
 Tropical Palms
 Swallow Sea Cave
 Yosemite Dawn
 Cribworks Kayak
 Sequoia Light
 Sunrise Seal Colony
 Lobster Village
 Western Ranch
 Everglades River of Grass
 Wildflower Elk
 Edge of Atlantic
 Milk Cows in the Morning
 San Francisco Tai Chi
 Teton Beaver
 Manatee Spring
 Island First Light
 Sunrise East
 Sunrise West
Season 2
 Katmai Bears
 Volcano Lagoon
 Homer Takeoff
 Ninagiak Island
 Glacier of Kenai Fjords
Season 3
 Mayan Pyramid
 Birds of Palo Verde
 Cloudforest Waterfall
 Playa Grande Moonset
 Dawn of Cerro de La Muerte
 Angkor Temples of Khmer Kings
 Li River Cormorants
 Ping An Rice Paddies
 Buddhists of Wat Svay
 Elephant Trunk Park
 Scandinavian Waterfall
 Foothills of Turkey
 Stonehenge Dawn
 Mediterranean Port
 Icelandic Geysir
 Argentinean Seal Pups
 Peruvian Rainforest Canopy
 Andean Dawn at Machu Picchu
 Amazon Parakeets
 Patagonian Penguins
 Christmas Lights
 Total Eclipse
 Polar Bears
 Secrets of the Sun (special documentary)
Season 4 – Viewers Choice
 The Skelligs of Ireland
 Great Barrier Reef
 Haleakala Crater
 Society Island Sunrise
 New Zealand Frost
Season 5 – Viewers Choice II
 Japanese Garden
 High Desert Arches
 Midnight Sun of Svalbard
 Vancouver Inside Passage
 Venetian Canals

References

External links 
 
 Sunrise Earth on Amazon Prime

Documentary films about nature
2004 American television series debuts
Animal Planet original programming